Era  is the seventh studio album released by the Italian folk/power metal band, Elvenking. The album returns more to the band's traditional sound of folk metal and power metal incorporating more folk elements into the songs that were more so lacking from previous albums such as The Scythe and Red Silent Tides. Guest appearances on vocals by Jon Oliva (Savatage), (Trans-Siberian Orchestra), (Jon Oliva's Pain) and Netta Dahlberg as well as a guitar solo performed by Teemu Mantysaari of (Wintersun) can be heard on the album. Prior to the album's release, Damna and Aydan did a sit down via YouTube going through the album track-by-track describing to fans where each song is coming from and what went into writing and recording the songs.

Track listing
"The Loser" - 4:58
"I Am The Monster" - 5:12 Guest appearance: Jon Oliva
"Midnight Skies, Winter Sighs" - 4:33
"A Song For The People" - 1:46 Guest appearance: Netta Dahlberg
"We, Animals" - 4:07
"Through Wolf's Eyes" - 3:19
"Walking Dead" - 3:44 Guest appearance: Teemu Mäntysaari
"Forget-Me-Not" - 5:39 Guest appearances: Jon Oliva & Netta Dahlberg
"Poor Little Baroness" - 5:19
"The Time Of Your Life" - 4:20
"Chronicle Of A Frozen Era" - 6:40
"Ophale" - 2:44
"Grey Inside" - 4:16 (digipack bonus track)
"Khanjar" - 4:26 (Instrumental) (digipack deluxe i-tunes bonus track)
"I Am The Monster" - 5:13 (Only Damna's vocals) (digipack bonus track)

Personnel 
Damnagoras -  Vocals
Aydan - Guitars
Rafahel - Guitars
Jakob - Bass
Symohn - Drums
Lethien - Violin

References

2012 albums
Elvenking (band) albums